Jarrod James Moseley (born 6 October 1972) is an Australian professional golfer.

Career
Moseley was born in Mandurah, Western Australia. He turned professional in 1997. He won the PGA Tour of Australasia Order of Merit in 1998/99, having won the European Tour co-sanctioned Heineken Classic during the season. He also went on to finish 16th on the European Tour Order of Merit that season, a career best.

Moseley finished well inside the top 100 on the European Tour Order of Merit every season until 2004, when he slipped to 117th, missing out on retaining his card by just one place. He regained his playing privileges immediately via the end of season qualifying school, but was again unable to replicate his form from previous years as he slipped further down the money list.

Amateur wins
1996 Riversdale Cup, Malaysian Amateur Championship

Professional wins (2)

European Tour wins (1)

1Co-sanctioned by the PGA Tour of Australasia

PGA Tour of Australasia wins (2)

*Lonard and Moseley agreed to share the 2002 Australian PGA Championship after failing light caused play to halt after one hole of a playoff.
1Co-sanctioned by the European Tour

PGA Tour of Australasia playoff record (0–1–1)

Results in major championships

Note: Moseley only played in The Open Championship.

CUT = missed the half-way cut
"T" = tied

Results in World Golf Championships

1Cancelled due to 9/11

"T" = Tied
NT = No tournament

Team appearances
Amateur
Nomura Cup (representing Australia): 1995
Eisenhower Trophy (representing Australia): 1996 (winners)

References

External links

Australian male golfers
European Tour golfers
PGA Tour of Australasia golfers
People from Mandurah
1972 births
Living people